"Together and Forever" is a song recorded by the German eurodance group Captain Jack. It was released in March 1997 as the lead single from their album, Operation Dance.

The song peaked at number 9 in Finland and number 20 in the Netherlands.

Music video
The music video was directed by Mark Glaeser and was filmed in Las Vegas, Nevada.

Charts

References

1997 songs
1997 singles
Captain Jack (band) songs
Music videos directed by Mark Glaeser